James Edward Ingram (February 16, 1952 – January 29, 2019) was an American singer, songwriter and record producer. He was a two-time Grammy Award-winner and a two-time Academy Award nominee for Best Original Song. After beginning his career in 1973, Ingram charted eight top 40 hits on the U.S. Billboard Hot 100 chart from the early 1980s until the early 1990s, as well as thirteen top 40 hits on the Hot R&B/Hip-Hop Songs chart. In addition, he charted 20 hits on the Adult Contemporary chart (including two number-ones). He had two number-one singles on the Hot 100: the first, a duet with fellow R&B artist Patti Austin, 1982's "Baby, Come to Me" topped the U.S. pop chart in 1983; "I Don't Have the Heart", which became his second number-one in 1990 was his only number-one as a solo artist.

In between these hits, he also recorded the song "Somewhere Out There" with fellow recording artist Linda Ronstadt for the animated film An American Tail. The song and the music video both became hits. Ingram co-wrote "The Day I Fall in Love", from the motion picture Beethoven's 2nd (1993), and singer Patty Smyth's "Look What Love Has Done", from the motion picture Junior (1994), which earned him nominations for Best Original Song from the Oscars, Golden Globes, and Grammy Awards in 1994 and 1995.

Biography

Early life
Ingram was born in Akron, Ohio, where he attended Akron's East High School and received a track scholarship to the University of Akron. Subsequently, he moved to Los Angeles and played with the band Revelation Funk, which made an appearance in the Rudy Ray Moore film Dolemite. He also later played keyboards for Ray Charles before becoming famous. James Ingram received his first publishing deal with 20th Century Fox publishing company, which is where he sang the $50 demo for "Just Once".

Career
Ingram provided the vocals to "Just Once" and "One Hundred Ways" on Quincy Jones's 1981 album The Dude, which earned Ingram triple Grammy nominations, including Best New Artist. "One Hundred Ways" won him the Grammy Award for Best Male R&B Vocal Performance for his work. On December 11, 1981, Ingram appeared as a guest on the Canadian comedy series SCTV (which aired on NBC), singing "Just Once". Ingram's debut album, It's Your Night, was released in 1983 and included the ballad "There's No Easy Way". He worked with other notable artists such as Donna Summer, Ray Charles, Anita Baker, Viktor Lazlo, Nancy Wilson, Natalie Cole, Kim Carnes, and Kenny Rogers. In October 1990, he scored a No. 1 hit on the Billboard Hot 100 with the love ballad "I Don't Have the Heart", from his It's Real album.

In 1984, Ingram received three additional Grammy nominations: "How Do You Keep the Music Playing?" (his second duet with recording artist Patti Austin), for Best Pop Performance by a Duo or Group with Vocals; the US Top 10 single, "P.Y.T. (Pretty Young Thing)" for Michael Jackson, which Ingram and Quincy Jones co-wrote, for Best R&B Song; and the track "Party Animal" for Best Male R&B Vocal Performance. In early 1985, he was nominated for his debut album (It's Your Night) for Best Male R&B Vocal Performance, and for its single, "Yah Mo B There" (a duet with fellow R&B musician Michael McDonald), for Best R&B Song and Best R&B Performance by a Duo or Group, and won the latter.

Ingram is perhaps best known for his hit collaborations with other vocalists. He scored a No. 1 hit on the Hot 100 chart in February 1983 with Patti Austin on the duet "Baby, Come to Me", a song made popular on TV's General Hospital. A second Austin–Ingram duet, "How Do You Keep the Music Playing?", was featured in the movie Best Friends (1982) and earned an Oscar nomination. In 1984, he teamed up with Kenny Rogers and Kim Carnes for the Top 40 ballad "What About Me?" In 1985, Ingram won a Grammy Award for "Yah Mo B There", a duet with Michael McDonald, and participated in the charity project "We Are the World".

Ingram teamed with American vocalist Linda Ronstadt and had a million-selling #2 hit in the U.S. and a Top 10 U.K. hit in 1987 with "Somewhere Out There", the theme from the animated feature film An American Tail. The song was awarded the 1987 Grammy Award for Song of the Year. It also received Academy Award and Golden Globe nominations. It was one of the last million-selling Gold-certified 45 RPM singles to be issued by the RIAA.

In the 1990s, Ingram's highest-profile team-up came again with Quincy Jones, on the song "The Secret Garden". This song also featured vocals by Barry White, El DeBarge, and Al B. Sure!. Soundtrack songs were popular for Ingram in the 1990s. From the movie Sarafina! came "One More Time", and from City Slickers came "Where Did My Heart Go?" In 1991, he and Melissa Manchester performed the song "The Brightest Star" in the animated Christmas film Precious Moments Timmy's Gift. In 1993, they performed the song again in the film's sequel Precious Moments Timmy's Special Delivery. Ingram's 1994 composition "The Day I Fall in Love", a duet with Dolly Parton, was the theme song for the movie Beethoven's 2nd and was nominated for an Academy Award for Best Original Song. Ingram and Parton performed the song live on the Oscar broadcast. In 1997, he and Carnie Wilson co-wrote the song "Our Time Has Come" and lent it to the animated film Cats Don't Dance.

During the summer of 2004, Ingram participated in the U.S. television reality show Celebrity Duets as a duet partner. The show combined professional vocalists, of various musical genres, with entertainers of different backgrounds in a weekly elimination competition. In 2006, Ingram and neo-soul singer Angie Stone teamed up on "My People". In 2011, Ingram joined Cliff Richard's list of special guest performers on his Soulicious Tour performing at various UK venues during November. He sang two songs from the album with Richard, as well a solo of "Just Once". In 2012, Ingram appeared as himself in the ABC television show Suburgatory, in the episode "The Motherload". Also in 2012, he was a guest vocalist at Debbie Allen's October 13 live show at the corner of Crenshaw Blvd. and Martin Luther King Blvd. celebrating the arrival of the Space Shuttle Endeavour, singing R. Kelly's "I Believe I Can Fly".

Death
Ingram died in Los Angeles of brain cancer on January 29, 2019, aged 66.

Discography

Studio albums

Compilation albums

Singles

Other appearances

Filmography
 1981 - SCTV "3D House of Beef" sketch, as himself
 1997: The Fearless Four as Buster (voice – English version)
 2012: Suburgatory; himself (episode: "The Motherload")

Awards and nominations

Grammy Awards
Ingram has won two Grammy Awards out of fourteen nominations.

Academy Award nominations
 1994: Best Original Song for "The Day I Fall in Love" from the motion picture Beethoven's 2nd (shared with Cliff Magness and Carole Bayer Sager)
 1995: Best Original Song for "Look What Love Has Done" the motion picture Junior (shared with Carole Bayer Sager, James Newton Howard, and Patty Smyth)

Golden Globe Award nominations
 1994: Best Original Song for "The Day I Fall in Love" (shared with Cliff Magness and Carole Bayer Sager)
 1995: Best Original Song for "Look What Love Has Done" (shared with Carole Bayer Sager, James Newton Howard, and Patty Smyth)

References

External links

1952 births
2019 deaths
20th-century African-American male singers
African-American male singer-songwriters
American baritones
American male pop singers
Grammy Award winners
Musicians from Akron, Ohio
Qwest Records artists
Singer-songwriters from Ohio
Private Music artists
Ballad musicians
Burials at Forest Lawn Memorial Park (Hollywood Hills)
Neurological disease deaths in California
Deaths from brain cancer in the United States
21st-century African-American male singers